The women's hammer throw at the 2013 World Championships in Athletics was held at the Luzhniki Stadium on 14–16 August.

After feeling out the ring, there were six automatic qualifiers to the final, most making it on their second attempt.  It took 70.47 to make the final.  Among the non-qualifiers was the world record holder Betty Heidler.

In the final, Jeneva McCall's first attempt 72.33 held up through the first 9 throwers until Tatyana Lysenko let loose a 77.58.  Zhang Wenxiu answered that with a 74.62 to move into second place.  The second round got more serious with three more throwers over 74 meters, with Wang Zheng moving into second with a personal best 74.90.  Lysenko had a second throw out over 77.  In the third round, Anita Włodarczyk moved into the lead, her 77.79 tickling her own championship record from 2009, what was at the time the world record.  Zhang moved past her teammate back into third with a 75.09.  And after leading most of the first round, McCall's day was done.  After the short break to rearrange the order, the fourth round was the decider.  The five competitors all fouled consecutively, then Zhang shored up her third place with a 75.58.  Next into the ring, Lysenko sent it out 78.80 a new championship record.  And following her, Włodarczyk set a new Polish national record with her 78.46.  In the final two rounds, nobody came within a meter of improving.

Performances in the World Championships contributed to the final scoring of the 2013 IAAF Hammer Throw Challenge – a first for the series.

Records
Prior to the competition, the records were as follows:

Qualification standards

Schedule

Results

Qualification
Qualification: 73.00 m (Q) and at least 12 best (q) advanced to the final.

Final
The final started at 19:00.

References

External links
Hammer throw results at IAAF website

Hammer throw
Hammer throw at the World Athletics Championships
2013 in women's athletics